Gursharan Singh  (born 8 March 1963) is a former Indian cricketer who played in one Test and one One Day International in 1990. 

While appearing as a substitute for Roger Binny in the Third Test against West Indies in 1983 at Ahmedabad, he became the first person to take four substitute catches in a Test. Gursharan later became a senior manager with the Steel Authority of India, Delhi.

In August 2018, he was appointed as the coach for Arunachal Pradesh. In September 2019 he was appointed coach of Uttarakhand.

References

External links
 

1963 births
India One Day International cricketers
India Test cricketers
North Zone cricketers
Punjab, India cricketers
Delhi cricketers
Living people
Cricketers from Amritsar
Indian cricket coaches